Magna is a metro township in Salt Lake County, Utah, United States. The current population of the township stands at 29,251 according to the 2020 census, a 10.4% increase over 26,505 in 2010.

History

Settlement
Settlement of the area began in 1851 shortly after pioneers reached the Salt Lake Valley. Early farmers settled in 1868 at the base of the northern Oquirrh Mountains and called their community Pleasant Green. By 1900, there were about 20 families in the area. One of the first Pleasant Green farmers was Abraham Coon, who established a livestock ranch and settlement called Coonville in a canyon mouth at about 5400 South now known as Coon Canyon. Coon Creek flows out of Coon Canyon and is one of the major Oquirrh Mountain drainages. Coon Creek flows north and west through Magna to the Great Salt Lake.

The Pleasant Green Cemetery located in the Oquirrh foothills, at about 3500 South, was established in 1883. In 1890, in response to a law requiring all children to receive free public education, the first school was built in the community.

1900-1960
In the early 1900s, copper mining activity in the Oquirrhs began transforming the Pleasant Green area from an agricultural hamlet to an industrial community. D.C. Jackling established the Utah Copper Company, which later became Kennecott Copper Corp. In 1906, the company began constructing its Magna Mill. Jackling chose the name "Magna" from the Latin word meaning "great" or "superior".

Beginning in 1903, Magna saw a large influx of Greek immigrants, primarily prompted by coal mine strikes in Carbon County, Utah and Fresno, California. This group eventually established a thriving Greektown and community. The formation of Magna's Greektown coincided with that of the forming of Salt Lake City, happening only about 15 miles to the east.

Boston Consolidated Copper constructed a second mill in the area in 1909. In 1911, the companies merged and the mill was renamed, Arthur Mill. Construction workers lived in a temporary settlement known as Ragtown. Several substantial homes were built in the tent city and later moved to the present community. As the mills began operating, some local farmers traded in their plows for a steady company paycheck and began moving in to work at the mills.

In 1914, Renald Woolley, the Post Master of the township, petitioned to have the Pleasant Green post office changed to Magna because of confusion with other towns such as Pleasant Grove. The petition was accepted and in a meeting above his store, the locals accepted the name of Magna for the town and post office, on October 19, 1915. (see West Valley View, June 9, 1983). By 1909, the Hawthorne School (no longer standing) had been built in the eastern Magna area. In 1908, the Webster School (destroyed by fire and demolished in June 2004) was built at the west end of what is now Main Street. In 1924, the first building of the present Cyprus High School was completed. Over the years, buildings and additions have been constructed on the campus. At the time, commuting to work by automobile was not practical. Few mineworkers had cars and cross valley roads were in marginal condition. Workers lived in the town and walked to the mills. Downtown Magna included churches, saloons, fraternal halls, and stores. Several small neighborhoods, such as Greektown, Japantown, Snaketown, and Little Italy, developed around Main Street. Many early residents were immigrants, primarily from Eastern Europe but Magna was not a mining town.

In 1914, an Italian women by the name of Anna Carrone settled here and met coal miner, Rocco Polidori. They became a couple and moved to Denver, Colorado and went on to found the meat company Polidori Sausage.

Between 1915 and 1960, the town's fortunes fluctuated with the copper industry. During the Great Depression, the mills shut down for a period, and workers were laid off. Around 1940, there was a resurgence as the pending war boosted copper demand. Growth continued after World War II, and throughout the 1960s.

1960-1980
By the 1960s, the community was experiencing the first signs of a suburban transition. The Hercules Powder Co., once a small dynamite manufacturing firm had begun producing rocket motors at its Bacchus Works plant, south of the Magna community, named after 1912 founder T.W. Bacchus. The increased jobs were one factor that encouraged subdivision development in the Magna, Kearns, and West Valley City areas.

In 1961, the voters in the Magna Improvement District (now the Magna Water and Sewer District) approved a bond that financed a sewage treatment plant, water storage tanks, pumps, and well development. The improvements created sufficient capacity to serve more than double the population at the time and helped open the way for development. Not only did Magna's population begin shifting southward during the 1960s, but also automobile commuting, both to work and shopping, became common. As business activity moved to other areas, Main Street slowly began to deteriorate. Presently, some of the commercial space there is vacant.

During the 1970s, as part of a general west valley suburbanization trend, the community experienced more dramatic growth. Inexpensive land south and east of the historic town center began being developed into moderately priced single-family homes. The new neighborhoods tended to attract middle-income working class couples with younger families. While the community had grown from approximately 8,900 in 1960 to 10,000 in 1970, the population had increased to over 23,000 by 2000. This increase is about double the countywide growth rate.

1980-present
The process for Magna to become a township took over 10 years. Growth and development continue to define Magna.

The West Bench plan for the redevelopment of mining land should have a major impact on the future of Magna. Kennecott Land plans major development in the areas immediately surrounding Magna. The area west of Magna along I-80 is currently slated to become one of 2 major "urban centers" for Kennecott Land's west bench development plan.

The Historic Main Street underwent a major remodel in 2006. Main Street has also become a popular location for filmmakers. including the Disney corporation, and films such as Disney Channel's TV movie, Dadnapped, and some of the Halloweentown movies filmed on Magna Main Street. A two-part episode (and series finale) of the TV series Touched by an Angel, "I'll Walk with You". The popular TV series Granite Flats also uses some of the Magna locations in part of the series.  Disney's series 'Andi Mack' is also filmed in Magna.

On March 18, 2020, Magna was the site of the epicenter for the 5.7 magnitude earthquake 2020 Salt Lake City Earthquake. The quake was followed by more than 850 aftershocks. The temblor struck at approximately 7:10 am, and was felt strongly across the Wasatch Front. Damage was light, although several historic buildings with unreinforced brick walls suffered damage.

Geography
The community lies just to the northeast of the Oquirrh Mountains and is directly south of the Great Salt Lake.

Demographics

According to estimates from the Kem C. Gardner Policy Institute of the University of Utah, as of 2015, there were 27,451 people in Magna. The racial makeup of the county was 69.76% non-Hispanic White, 0.30% Black, 0.48% Native American, 1.50% Asian, 0.37% Pacific Islander, and 1.95% from two or more races. 25.64% of the population were Hispanic or Latino of any race.

Education
Magna lies within the Granite School District and is home to 5 elementary schools, Copper Hills, Elk Run, Lake Ridge, Magna, and Pleasant Green. It also has Matheson Junior High, and Cyprus High School, whose sports teams compete in 5A-level competition (1A being the lowest and 5A the highest). The former Brockbank Junior High was closed in 2016 and combined with the Cyprus High campus.

Transportation
Magna lies on the grid system of the Salt Lake Valley, between 7200 and 9200 West and 2100 and 4100 South. SR-201 runs along the northern border as an expressway and intersects with I-80 to the west. West 3500 South (SR-171) is the major east–west local road, while South 8400 West (SR-111) is the major north–south road. The Utah Transit Authority (UTA) operates a local bus route and bus rapid transit (BRT) line within the community, both follow roughly the same route and enter from West Valley City. The BRT line is called 3500 South MAX and was the first and, as of April 2016, still the only BRT route operated by UTA. The bus system goes from UTA's Millcreek TRAX station on West 3300 South all the way to South 8400 South in Magna, between which it passes by the beginning of the TRAX Green Line (which connects with the Salt Lake City International Airport, via Downtown Salt Lake City the West Valley Central station by the Valley Fair Mall. Although the bus route of the 3500 South MAX stops at South 8400 South in Magna, the bus also loops around other places in Magna, including the majority of Magna Main Street. The 3500 South MAX runs every 15 minutes on the weekdays, as opposed to a majority of the UTA bus routes which run every half-hour to an hour.

Mass media
The Magna Times is a local weekly broadsheet community newspaper that is based and published in Magna. In 2009, it had a circulation of Arbor 4,000 copies.

Culture 
Magna is home to The Empress Theatre. Due to its historical significance, the theatre was added to the National Register for Historic Places on May 9, 1985 (National Register #85000962).

Downtown Magna was used as a central filming location for the hit Disney Channel series Andi Mack. "The Spoon" Diner, a popular location for Andi and her friends to eat at, was actually made specifically for the show.

Notable people 
Gary Andersen, head football coach, Utah State University
Parley Parker Christensen, Utah and California politician, Esperantist. Teacher in Murray.
Nathaniel Coleman, 2020 Olympic silver-medalist in men's combined sport climbing.
Emily S. Richards national suffrage leader. 
 Robert F. Sanders, American YouTuber, AKA "Road Guy Rob".

See also

 List of census-designated places in Utah
 Clair Huffaker
 Kennecott Utah Copper

References

Sources

 
 
 The Magna Community Master Plan, Salt Lake County Public Works Department Planning Division, February 1989.
 Magna Town Council

External links

 
 Magna Chamber of Commerce 
 Magna Town Council
 Art in Magna
 3500 South MAX (official UTA web page)

2001 establishments in Utah
Wasatch Front
Townships in Salt Lake County, Utah
Former census-designated places in Utah
Salt Lake City metropolitan area
Mining communities in Utah
Townships in Utah